María Elena Santamaría Gómez (born May 31, 1971) is a Mexican professional wrestler, known mainly for her work in the Mexican professional wrestling promotion Consejo Mundial de Lucha Libre (CMLL), where she works under the ring name Marcela. As Marcela, she is one of the top técnicas (the "good" characters, or faces) in CMLL. Her daughter is also a professional wrestler, known under the name Skadi, who often teams with her mother. Santamaría has worked for CMLL since the early 1990s and has also wrestled in Japan and on the Mexican independent circuit.

In 2018, she began her fifth reign as CMLL World Women's Champion, which is a CMLL record. She is a one-time Mexican National Women's Champion, held the District Federal Women's championship for over five years, and won the XMW Women's Championship. She has won several major luchas de apuestas, bet matches, winning the masks of La Gata, Rosa Negra, and La Seductora as well as the hair of La Briosa, Tiffany, Dalys la Caribeña and Princesa Blanca.

Early life
María Elena Santamaría Gómez was born on May 31, 1971, in Mexico City, Mexico. She grew up in Mexico City, living close to Arena Coliseo, where Empresa Mexicana de Lucha Libre (EMLL) held several Lucha Libre events each week. Her mother was a fan and brought her daughter to the shows from a young age. Initially, when Marcela wanted to become a professional wrestler her mother opposed it, causing a rift between the mother and daughter at the time, which was later reconciled. Marcela had her first child at the age of 16. Her second child, a daughter, became a professional wrestler as well, working under the ring name Skadi, and she often teams with her mother.

Professional wrestling career
Santamaría began training for her professional wrestling career in the mid-1980s, at a time when female wrestling was banned in Mexico City itself, and only promoted by a few companies outside of the capitol. She made her debut in December 1985 in Actopan, Hidalgo. For her debut she borrowed an ill-fitting mask and boxing shoes as she did not have any of her own. After the match, she decided to never wear a mask again. She was billed simply as "Marcela" as she began working on the independent circuit. The ban on women's wrestling was lifted in 1986, allowing EMLL and other companies promotion shows in the capitol to employ female wrestlers.

Consejo Mundial de Lucha Libre (early 1990s–present)
In the early 1990s she began working for Consejo Mundial de Lucha Libre (CMLL). Her first lucha de apuestas (Spanish for "bet match", the most prestigious match type in lucha libre) took place on September 7, 1991, where Marcela defeated La Migala. After the match La Migala had her hair shaved off, per lucha libre traditions. In the mid-1990s and early 2000s CMLL did not focus on their women's division, and often there was over a month between women's matches on a CMLL show. This meant that Marcela began working for a variety of minor Mexican promotions on the independent circuit. On August 3, 2001, Marcela teamed up with male wrestler El Mohicano I to defeat La Gata and Black Machine in an intergender lucha de apuestas match where both their male and female opponents left the ring with bald heads. She also competed in a torneo cibernetico elimination match for International Wrestling Revolution Group's newly created Intercontinental Women's Championship. The match also included Flor Metallica, Josseline, La Amapola, La Diabólica, Lady Metal, La Migala and tournament winner Ayako Hamada.

In 2004 CMLL began featuring more women's wrestling again and Marcela was one of the wrestlers who was given a full-time role with CMLL. At some point prior to September 20, 2004, Marcela won the Distrito Federal Women's Championship, with a successful championship defense against La Amapola on that date. Marcela and Dark Angel qualified for the finals of a tournament for the vacant CMLL World Women's Championship by outlasting Hiroka, India Sioux, La Medusa, La Nazi, Linda Star, Princesa Sujei, and Sahori. The following week, at the CMLL 72nd Anniversary Show, Marcela defeated Dark Angel to win the championship. Subsequently, she defended the title against Hiroka once and La Amapola on a number of occasions until her title reign ended on June 9, 2006, when Hiroka defeated her.

Marcela and Princesa Sujey outlasted 12 other women in a torneo cibernetico elimination match to qualify for the finals of a tournament for the vacant Mexican National Women's Championship, followed by Marcela defeating Princesa Sujey to win the title. While Marcela held the championship until January 30, 2009, 637 days, she only successfully defended the championship once, defeating La Amapola on August 5, 2007. Her reign as Mexican National Women's Champion ended at the hands of Princesa Blanca, who pinned Marcela to win the championship. Marcela defeated, and unmasked, Rosa Negra after winning a lucha de apuestas match at the 53. Aniversario de Arena México show. Marcel defeated La Amapola on October 28, 2011, to win the CMLL World Women's Championship for the second time, starting a 29-day reign that ended at the hands of Ayumi Kurihara in Japan.

Ayumi travelled to Mexico in March 2012, losing the title back to Marcela on March 9. During her third reign, Marcela successfully defended the championship on 12 occasions, in Mexico, the United States and Japan. Marcela was one of ten women risking their mask or hair in the steel cage match main event match of the 2012 Infierno en el Ring show on June 29, 2019. Marcela was the third woman to climb out of the cage, keeping her hair safe, while the match ended with Princesa Blanca defeating Goya Kong to unmask her. A new group of wrestlers had appeared in CMLL In 2012, Los Invasores ("The Invaders"), with the storyline being that they represented CMLL's main rival AAA. Female wrestler Tiffay was part of that group and was immediately put into a storyline feud with Marcela. This led to a lucha de apuestas match on August 5, where Marcela pinned her opponent, forcing Tiffany to have her hair cut off afterward.

In late 2014 Marcela began a feud with Dalys la Caribeña, as Dalys had risen up the ranks of CMLL during Marcela's title reign. The two met in one of the featured matches at the 2014 Homenaje a Dos Leyendas, where Marcela defeated Dalys in a lucha de apuestas match. Marcela and Princesa Sugej teamed up for the 2014 Juicio Final show, defeating Princesa Blanca and La Seductora.  La Seductora had to unmask, while Princesa Blanca was shaved bald and forced into retirement. Her 1008-day reign ended on December 12, 2014, as she lost the belt to Syuri on a show in Japan. Marcela began a fourth reign on April 10, 2015, when Syuri came to Mexico for a tour, losing the championship to Marcela on her last day in Mexico. During her fourth reign, Marcela successfully defended the title against Dalys and Zeuxis, before she lost the championship to Dalys on March 11, 2016.

On March 11, 2016, Marcela lost the CMLL World Women's Championship to Dalys la Caribeña. Marcela and Zeuxis outlasted seven other female wrestlers in a torneo cibernetico to qualify for the finals of a tournament for the vacant CMLL-Reina International Championship on August 6, 2017. The following week Zeuxis pinned Marcela to win the title. Marcela began her fifth CMLL World Women's Championship reign on November 19, 2018, as she defeated Dalys to win the title. Her first championship defense took place on April 29, 2019, as she defeated then-reigning Mexican National Women's Champion La Metálica. She followed that up with a successful defense against La Amapola in July 2019.

CMLL held their first Universal Amazonas Championship tournament in August 2019. Marcela competed in the first block of eight wrestlers, but was eliminated by Avispa Dorada. La Metálica would later lose to Dalys in the finals, earning Dalys a title match with Marcela at the CMLL 86th Anniversary Show. The match had to be cancelled as Marcela suffered an ankle injury leading up to the show and was not able to compete. Dalys did get a championship match in December, but lost to Marcela.

Japan (1999–present)

CMLL has collaborated with various Japanese wrestling promotions, including sending representatives from their women's division to work for female-only Japanese promotions. Marcela's first major tour of Japan ran from August to September 1999, where she worked for Big Japan Pro-Wrestling (BJW), starting with a victory over Japanese wrestler Andromeda, a male exótico, on August 2. She later returned to Japan for individual BJW matches in October and December 1999. She worked a second extended BJW tour from January 2, 2000, to March 31, 2001, where she made multiple tours to Japan. Her most frequent partner during the tour was Chihiro Nakano, although they also fought on opposite sides of the ring on some occasions. She returned to BJW in 2010 for their 15th Anniversary Death tour.

After touring with BJW, Marcela next worked with NEO Women's Pro Wrestling, Japanese Women Pro-Wrestling Project, International Women's * Grand Prix, and JDStar between 2001 and 2010. On May 5, 2011, Marcel traveled to Japan and unsuccessfully challenged La Amapola for the CMLL Women's World Championship on a Universal Woman's Pro Wrestling REINA on the first show of the promotion. In November 2011, Marcela returned, this time as CMLL Women's World Champion, but lost the title to Ayumi Kurihara on a REINA show. Two years later, Marcela returned to Japan, this time wrestling Ray for the CMLL Women's World Championship, but was not successful. Her 2014 return included Marcela successfully turn back the challenge of Syuri on August 30, but lost the championship to Syuri on December 12, marking the third time she lost the CMLL Women's World Championship in Japan. Marcela returned to Japan, for a tour that included a successful CMLL Women's Championship defense against Tae Honma on January 27, 2019, and against Tsukushi on September 15.

Mexican independent circuit (2005–present)
Marcela, like all CMLL workers, is allowed to take independent circuit bookings on days she is not needed by CMLL. Once CMLL began to promote women's wrestling on a more regular basis her independent work was reduced, giving precedence to CMLL matches. One of her major independent circuit matches was a six-woman steel cage match where the last woman in the cage would be shaved bald or forced to remove her mask. In the end Marcela pinned La Migala, forcing her to be shaved bald afterward. She would also regularly work for Toryumon Mexico as the company had a close working relationship with CMLL.

CMLL has allowed Marcel to defend the CMLL World Women's Championship on non-CMLL shows. For example, she defended the championship against La Amapola on a show in Nezahualcoyotl in 2005. She later challenged for the championship, but lost to La Amapola on a show in Guatemala, and had a successful defense against La Amapola during her third reign. September 9, 2012 saw Marcela outlast 11 other women to win the Copa Femenil Realizada tournament. Later that year, Marcela defeated Ludark Shaitan to win the Xtrem Mexican Wrestling's Women's Championship. The match was the only time that Marcela worked for XMW and never lost the championship in the ring. On February 29, 2020, Marcela survived a six-way hair vs. mask match, escaping the match before India Sioux pinned Casandra to win the match and the right to cut Casandra's hair off.

US independent circuit (2012, 2017)
Marcela has only made a limited number of appearances on the US independent circuit, has twice crossed into the United States for matches in 2012. The first match was a successful CMLL Women's World Championship defense against Tiffany on April 24 and then she returned in June to team up with Baby Star to defeat Princesa Guerrera and Rossy Moreno. CMLL has had a partnership with the US-based Ring of Honor (ROH) for many years, which means that ROH wrestlers traveled to Mexico and worked for CMLL and vice versa. For the 2017 Supercard of Honor XI, ROH brought in Marcela and La Amapola for a singles match where Marcela pinned La Amapola.

Championships and accomplishments
 Comision de Box y Lucha D.F.
 Distrito Federal Women's Championship (1 time)
 Consejo Mundial de Lucha Libre
 CMLL World Women's Championship (5 times)
 Mexican National Women's Championship (1 time)
 Pro Wrestling Illustrated
 Ranked No. 73 of the top 100 female singles wrestlers in the PWI Women's 100 in 2020
 Xtreme Mexican Wrestling
 XMW Women's Championship (1 time, current)

Luchas de apuestas record

Notes

References

1971 births
Living people
Mexican female professional wrestlers
Sportspeople from Mexico City
20th-century professional wrestlers
21st-century professional wrestlers
CMLL World Women's Champions